Aliabad-e Fakhrud (also Romanized as ‘Alīābād-e Fakhrūd; also known as ‘Alīābād) is a village in Fakhrud Rural District, Qohestan District, Darmian County, South Khorasan Province, Iran. At the 2006 census, its population was 75, in 21 families.

References 

Populated places in Darmian County